Kashal-e Azad may refer to:
 Kashal-e Azad Mahalleh
 Kashal-e Azad Sara